The 2017 Team Ice Racing World Championship was the 39th edition of the Team World Championship. The final was held on 11/12 March, 2017, in Inzell, Germany. Russia won their 15th consecutive title and 23rd title overall.

Final Classification

See also 
 2017 Individual Ice Racing World Championship
 2017 Speedway World Cup in classic speedway
 2017 Speedway Grand Prix in classic speedway

References 

Ice speedway competitions
World